Gentiana baeuerlenii is a flowering plant in the family Gentianaceae and is endemic to New South Wales. It is a small annual herb with whitish-blue  flowers.

Description

Taxonomy
Gentiana baeuerlenii was first formally described in 1988 by Laurence George Adams and the description was published in Telopea. The specific epithet (baeuerlenii) is in honour of the Bombala postmaster Wilhelm Baeuerlen, a keen amateur naturalist, who in 1887 sent the type specimen to Ferdinand von Mueller for identification.

Distribution and habitat
This gentiana is believed to grow in moist locations near Bombala in New South Wales.

References

baeuerlenii
Flora of New South Wales